Hristo Tsvetanov (born 29 March 1978, in Cherven Bryag) is a Bulgarian male volleyball player who was a member of the Bulgaria men's national volleyball team. He was a part of the Bulgarian national team that competed in the 2008 Summer Olympics. At club level, Tsvetanov started his career in Lokomotiv Sofia and then moved to Levski Siconco Sofia. He later played for Diatec Trentino in Italy and Olympiacos in Greece.

References

External links
 info about Tsvetanov on the FIVB official site

Living people
1978 births
Bulgarian men's volleyball players
Olympiacos S.C. players
People from Cherven Bryag
Volleyball players at the 2008 Summer Olympics
Olympic volleyball players of Bulgaria